Hybrid language may refer to:

A multi-paradigm programming language, a programming language that draws on elements from more than one programming paradigm, in computer science
In natural language, a mixed language deriving from several languages simultaneously 
Any result of language contact

See also
Hybrid (disambiguation)